For air traffic control, SASS-C is an acronym for "Surveillance Analysis Support System for ATC-Centre". SASS-C Service is part of Eurocontrol Communications, navigation and surveillance.

Introduction 

SASS-C Service provides two main software suites:
 VERIFication: ATC surveillance infrastructure assessment.
 PREDICTion: performance theoretical calculation of the ATC surveillance sensors.

VERIFication

Usage 

There are two key functions of SASS-C VERIFication:
 evaluation of the actual performance of ATC sensors or infrastructure against different standard like Eurocontrol Specification for ATM Surveillance System Performance (ESASSP).
 incident investigation.

SASS-C VERIFication is designed to handle all current surveillance technologies (PSR, SSR, Mode-S, ADS-B, WAM) as well as trackers. Evolutions for handling drones, Multi Static Primary Surveillance (MSPSR) and Surface Movement Area-specific sensors are considered in the future.

Modules 

SASS-C VERIFication is divided into many modules. The key ones are:
 IRIS: ATC surveillance data recording, decoding and statistics. In supports many framing or coding  surveillance data format. One between many: ASTERIX.
 OTR (Opportunity Traffic Reconstructor): build a reference trajectory based on the ATC surveillance data generated by the opportunity traffic. This module is widely inspired by the real-time tracker technologies like Kalman filter. But it takes also advantage that it works off-line: the aircraft trajectories are known over the complete dataset time window.
 CMP (Comparator evaluation suite): it is the hearth of VERIFication. The CMP module compares the ATC surveillance data against reference that can be generated by OTR or imported from external source. It generates performance indicators (e.g. detection probability, accuracy) suitable for assessment against standards like ESASSP. 
 REPORT: configurable reporting and trend analysis.
 DISPlay: this module displays ATC surveillance data, reconstructed data and performance indicators on different supports like geographical view, scatter diagram, table or mosaic.

History 

Since the beginning of development in 1988 based on MURATREC (1985), the SASS-C software has been under constant evolution to cope with supplementary user requirements, to cover surveillance technology upgrades and to follow software technology changes.

SASS-C v6 

In version 6, both suites where included in a common package just named SASS-C.

This early version was supporting only PSR/SSR/Mode-S Radars and trackers.

VERIFication v7 

Since end of 2003 and in order to prepare SASS-C for the next decade, important software re-engineering has been undertaken in conjunction with functional upgrades, with the aim to introduce up to date technologies in all relevant fields while enhancing system quality. The main functional upgrades relate to the introduction of Aircraft Derived data (Mode S and ADS-B), and multilateration technology in the Surveillance environment.

It consists into four different independent suites:

 IRIS (IOSS Recording and Import into SCDB) is the front element of SASS-C handling Surveillance Data from various sensors. The functionality comprises decoding (one between many, ASTERIX data format), recording and computation of statistics.
 TRES (Trajectory Reconstruction and Evaluation Suite) is the core suite of SASS-C, carrying out the reconstruction of reference trajectories from the input data, and doing the evaluation of Surveillance constituent's performance.
 SMART (Simulator for Multi-radar Analysis from Realistic Traffic) is an upgrade of the present real-time simulator generating Surveillance data reports by sampling simulated aircraft trajectories.
 SCAS (Surveillance Coverage Analysis Suite) comprises RASCAL (RAdar Sharing CALculation) and CAPT (Coverage And Planning Tool for ADS-B and TIS-B), a new tool to aid in the positioning of ADS-B and TIS-B ground stations by assessing various communication load scenarios.

IRIS and TRES store the surveillance data in a common database.

VERIFication v8 and later 

The version 8 is the result of another re-engineering for better performance and maximum openness.

The suite has been re-organised as described in Modules sections.

Since 2021, the version identification has changed to the format vYY.N (e.g. 21.3) with YY, the two last digits of the year and N, the iteration over the year.

PREDICTion 

Taking different resolutions of Digital Terrain Elevation Data – DTED as input, PREDICTion computes the theoretical performance of ATC surveillance sensors like radars and ADS-B or WAM ground stations:
 target detection  probability 
 interference between sensors
 target position accuracy

The theoretical coverage is generated in two forms that can be used in other tools like SASS-C VERIFication:
 screening files: obstacle ranges and elevations per azimuth.
 surveillance map: minimum visible altitude per cell in horizontal plane.

History

References

Further reading 
 
  
  
 
 
 
 
 

Air traffic control systems